Podolsk is the name of several inhabited localities in Russia.

Urban localities
Podolsk, a city in Moscow Oblast; administratively incorporated as a city under oblast jurisdiction

Rural localities
Podolsk, Republic of Bashkortostan, a selo in Tanalyksky Selsoviet of Khaybullinsky District of the Republic of Bashkortostan
Podolsk, Novosibirsk Oblast, a village in Bagansky District of Novosibirsk Oblast
Podolsk, Omsk Oblast, a village in Roshchinsky Rural Okrug of Gorkovsky District of Omsk Oblast
Podolsk, Orenburg Oblast, a selo in Podolsky Selsoviet of Krasnogvardeysky District of Orenburg Oblast
Podolsk, Tomsk Oblast, a selo in Bakcharsky District of Tomsk Oblast